Patrick Thaddeus (June 6, 1932 – April 28, 2017) was an American professor and the Robert Wheeler Willson Professor of Applied Astronomy Emeritus at Harvard University. He is best known for mapping carbon monoxide in the Milky Way galaxy and was responsible for the construction of the CfA 1.2 m Millimeter-Wave Telescope.

Early life
He was born on June 6, 1932, to Elizabeth and Victor Thaddeus. His mother divorced Thaddeus when he and his sister, Deirdre, were very young. She later remarried to Vincent Copeland.

Education
Thaddeus graduated from University of Delaware in 1953 with a Bachelor of Science degree. He was awarded a Fulbright Fellowship through which he attended the University of Oxford, graduating with a Master's degree in theoretical physics in 1955. His doctoral work was at Columbia University, where he earned his Ph.D. under Charles Hard Townes in 1960 with a thesis titled Beam Maser Spectroscopy.

Career

After earning his doctorate, Thaddeus stayed at Columbia University as a research associate in the Columbia Radiation Laboratory until 1961, when he took a position working for NASA at the Goddard Institute for Space Studies, where he remained until 1986. He also taught at Columbia University during that period, from 1965 until 1986. It was during his time at Columbia that the CfA 1.2 m Millimeter-Wave Telescope was built. In 1986, Thaddeus (along with the 1.2 meter telescope and other scientists on the team) moved to Harvard, where he remained for the rest of his teaching career and remained Professor Emeritus until his death in April 2017.

Thaddeus held a few other teaching positions during his career at institutions including State University of New York, Stony Brook (1966–1967), University of California, Berkeley (1968), and University of Cambridge (1983–1984).

Thaddeus and his colleagues designed a radio telescope custom-built for the task of mapping the entire Milky Way in CO. The 1.2 meter Millimeter-Wave Telescope was designed with a relatively small dish and consequently a relatively large beamwidth of about 1/8 degree, which can be likened to a wide-angle lens. With this new instrument, it suddenly became possible to map large stretches of sky in relatively small amounts of time. The telescope is nicknamed "The Mini" because of its unusually small size. Together, "The Mini" and its twin in Chile have obtained what is by far the most extensive, uniform, and widely used Galactic survey of interstellar carbon monoxide (CO).

Harvard astronomer Tom Dame, in collaboration with Thaddeus, discovered the Far 3 kpc Arm of the Milky Way.

Personal life

Thaddeus married the former Janice Farrar (daughter of John Chipman Farrar and Margaret Petherbridge Farrar) in 1963. Janice Farrar Thaddeus was a scholar, poet, editor, and former Harvard lecturer in English; she died of a stroke in 2001 at the age of 68. They have two children: Eva (b. 1965) and Michael (b. 1967), as well as two grandchildren.

Publications

Thaddeus authored or co-authored more than three hundred research papers and more than twenty invited papers in astronomy and physics.

Honors and awards

Honorary Doctor of Science, University of Chicago, 2003
Sir Harold Thompson Memorial Award, 2002
Herschel Medal, Royal Astronomical Society, 2001
Fairchild Distinguished Scholar, California Institute of Technology, 1994
Russell Marker Lecturer, Pennsylvania State University, 1989
Election to the American Academy of Arts and Sciences, 1989
Election to the National Academy of Sciences, 1987
Medal for Exceptional Scientific Achievement, NASA, 1985
John C. Lindsay Memorial Award, National Aeronautics and Space Administration, Goddard Space Flight Center, 1976
Medal for Exceptional Scientific Achievement, NASA, 1970
Postdoctoral Fellowship, National Academy of Sciences, National Research Council, 1961–1964
Fulbright Fellowship, 1953–1955

Professional memberships

Fellow, American Physical Society
American Astronomical Society
International Astronomical Union
Sigma Xi
American Philosophical Society

Advisory committees

NASA Astrobiology Oversight Committee, 1999–2002
Center for Astrophysical Research in Antarctica (CARA), 1999–
Chair: Task Group on Space Astronomy and Astrophysics, National Research Council, 1996–97
President's Visiting Committee, Caltech, 1995
Visiting Committee, National Radio Astronomy Observatory, 1991–94; Chair 1994
Steering Committee, SAO Submillimeter Array, 1993–
Director's Advisory Committee, NRAO Green Bank Telescope Project 1989–90
Astronomy Survey Committee 1989–90, Radio Astronomy Panel, Infrared Panel, and Theory and Laboratory Astrophysics Panel
Scientific Organizing Committee, IAU Symposium No. 147, on Fragmentation of Molecular Clouds and Star Formation, Grenoble, 1990
National Radio Astronomy Observatory Ad Hoc Long–Range Planning Committee, 1988
NASA Management Operations Working Group for Infrared Astronomy, 1987–1990
International Organizing Committee, Cologne– Zermatt International Symposium on the Physics and Chemistry of Interstellar Clouds, Zermatt, 1988
Scientific Committee, Meeting on "Polycyclic Molecules and Astrophysics," Les Houches, 1986
Visiting Committee, Department of Astronomy and Astrophysics, University of Chicago, 1983
AURA Visiting Committee (Kitt Peak, Cerro Tololo, and Sacramento Peak Observatories), 1983–86
NASA Management Operations Working Group for Airborne Astronomy, 1982–1986
Visiting Committee, Haystack Observatory, Massachusetts Institute of Technology, 1982–85; Chair, 1985
Scientific Organizing Committee, Symposium on the Orion Nebula to Honor Henry Draper, New York, 1981
Visiting Committee, Hat Creek Observatory, University of California, 1981
Universities Research Association (URA), Astronomy Advisory Committee, 1979–81
NASA Space Science Advisory Committee, 1979
Astronomy Survey Committee, 1978–80; Chair, Radio Astronomy Panel; report published as Astronomy and Astrophysics for the 1980s (National Academy Press, 1982;2)
Submillimeter Space Telescope Working Group, 1977
Editorial Board, The Astrophysical Journal, 1976–80
Scientific Organizing Committee, IAU Symposium No. 75, on "Star Formation," Geneva, 1976
Visiting Committee, National Radio Astronomy Observatory, 1973–76

References

External links
Patrick Thaddeus, Faculty Webpage, Harvard University School of Engineering and Applied Sciences
Patrick Thaddeus at the Center for Astrophysics  Harvard & Smithsonian
Patrick Thaddeus, Faculty Webpage, Harvard University Department of Astronomy
Patrick Thaddeus CV at Center for Astrophysics  Harvard & Smithsonian
Patrick Thaddeus AAS obituaries

1932 births
2017 deaths
American astronomers
Columbia University alumni
Harvard University faculty
Members of the United States National Academy of Sciences
Members of the American Philosophical Society
Fulbright alumni